Tatsu is a flying roller coaster designed by Bolliger & Mabillard at the Six Flags Magic Mountain amusement park located in Valencia, California, United States. Manufactured by Bolliger & Mabillard, it opened as the tallest, fastest, and longest flying coaster in the world on May 13, 2006. Tatsu also features the world's tallest pretzel loop and the only zero-gravity roll inversion on a flying coaster model. Nearly a decade later, The Flying Dinosaur opened at Universal Studios Japan in 2016, breaking Tatsu's length record and matching its speed. In its debut season, Tatsu was ranked 40th among steel coasters in the annual Golden Ticket Awards from Amusement Today, peaking with a rank of 28 in 2012.

History
Rumors of a new roller coaster being built at Six Flags Magic Mountain first emerged in the summer of 2004. Land clearing began in mid-2005 around the Samurai Summit area of the park with track for the new roller coaster arriving from Ohio soon thereafter. Construction permits filed by Six Flags Magic Mountain and a trademark for the name Tatsu (filed on August 23, 2005) were later found by the public. Tatsu was officially announced to the public on November 17, 2005. Both Revolution and Roaring Rapids were temporarily closed in order for the roller coaster to be built. After construction and testing was complete, Tatsu opened to the general public on May 13, 2006.

Tatsu broke several records upon opening, becoming the world's tallest, fastest, and longest flying roller coaster. Tatsu still remains the tallest, and it also features the tallest pretzel loop in the world, which stands . Its zero-gravity roll is the only one featured on a flying coaster model.

Ride experience

After riders board the train situated in a vertical, standing position, each car then pivots its seats backward 90 degrees, transitioning riders into a horizontal flying position. The train then dispatches from the station, makes a slight s-bend turn toward the  chain lift hill. This is followed by an upward right turn into the first inversion, a  corkscrew. This leads into a downward left turn immediately followed by an upward left turn, and then the train enters a  zero-gravity roll.

Riders then experience a sharp drop followed by an  horseshoe element. The train makes a left turn and enters a record-breaking  pretzel loop. This is followed by a slight left turn leading into an inline twist and a 135-degree downward right turn. The train rises back up slightly, leveling out and entering a mid-course brake run. Another series of turns follows, with the train veering downward and then upward to the left, ending at the final brake run and returning to the station. One cycle of the ride lasts approximately two minutes.

Characteristics

Trains
Tatsu operates with three steel and fiberglass trains. Each train has eight cars that can seat four riders in a single row for a total of 32 riders per train. Each seat has its own over-the-shoulder-restraint and a pair of ankle restraints to hold the riders' feet in place. The trains are painted green, yellow, orange, and red.

In the station, the trains are oriented in a vertical position in order to allow riders to board. Once the restraints are locked, the train seats are rotated forward 90 degrees into a horizontal position and the train is then dispatched from the station. When the train returns to the station, the seats rotate back down and the riders disembark for the next guests.

Track
To slow the train, air brakes are utilized in both brake runs. The track was fabricated by Clermont Steel Fabricators in Batavia, Ohio, which manufactures Bolliger & Mabillard's roller coasters. The coaster is painted red and yellow with orange supports.In Between 2021 and 2022, Tatsu's color scheme was altered so that it now has green supports and a dark orange track.

Reception
Joel Bullock from The Coaster Critic gave Tatsu a nine out of ten for its close-to-the-ground approaches and intense pretzel loop at the bottom of the element. Justice from Park Thoughts also gave the roller coaster a nine out of ten saying that, "The lift hill is one of the most suspenseful I have ever experienced." Justice also praises the ride's intense g-forces experienced throughout the layout of Tatsu. In 2006, Discovery Channel's Mega Builders aired an episode which followed the construction of Tatsu. The episode showed how the coaster was assembled and the problems construction crews had to overcome.

In Tatsu's opening year, it was named the 40th best steel roller coaster in the world in Amusement Today's Golden Ticket Awards; tied with Talon at Dorney Park. It peaked at 28th place in 2012.

References

External links 

 Official site

Roller coasters in California
Roller coasters operated by Six Flags
Roller coasters introduced in 2006
Six Flags Magic Mountain
Articles containing video clips
Flying roller coasters manufactured by Bolliger & Mabillard